Anthochortus is a group of plants in the Restionaceae described as a genus in 1837. The entire genus is endemic to  Cape Province in South Africa.

 Species
 Anthochortus capensis Esterh.
 Anthochortus crinalis (Mast.) H.P.Linder
 Anthochortus ecklonii Nees 
 Anthochortus graminifolius (Kunth) H.P.Linder
 Anthochortus insignis (Mast.) H.P.Linder
 Anthochortus laxiflorus (Nees) H.P.Linder
 Anthochortus singularis Esterh.

References

Restionaceae
Endemic flora of South Africa
Flora of the Cape Provinces
Fynbos
Natural history of Cape Town
Poales genera